Georgi Demetradze (born 26 September 1976) is a Georgian former professional footballer who played as a striker. He made 56 appearances for the Georgia national team scoring 12 goals.

Career
Born in Tbilisi, Demetradze played for the Dinamo Tbilisi youth team and signed for the club in 1994 after spending two seasons with Kaheti Telavi. He has become the Georgian league top scorer with Dinamo.

In 1997 Demetradze moved to Rotterdam to play for Feyenoord, but an injury limited his playing time. After one season in Netherlands, he moved to Russia to play for Alania Vladikavkaz. With them Demetradze has become Russian Top Division top scorer in 1999. In 2000, he transferred to Dynamo Kyiv to become a Ukrainian champion. While there he famously missed an open goal against Manchester United in the Champions League that would have seen the English side eliminated from the competition.

After a year at Real Sociedad Demetradze returned to Russia where he spent half a season with Lokomotiv Moscow and half a season with Alania.

In 2003, he moved to Ukraine again, to play for Metalurh Donetsk. He spent 2.5 seasons with them. In mid-2005 he went to play for Alania for the third time. After Alania were relegated, Demetradze transferred to Maccabi Tel Aviv. In 2005 Demetradze participated in three different Leagues. In 2007, he returned to Ukraine and played for Arsenal Kyiv. A year later he signed an annual contract with Azerbaijani football club FC Baku.

Post retirement
Demetradze was arrested by Georgian police in July 2010, and on 23 March 2011 he was found guilty of extortion from people who lost at illegal betting on sports, and sentenced to six years of imprisonment. He was released from prison as a political prisoner on 13 January 2013. Demetradze later married and had a daughter.

Career statistics
All data on his participation in the top league of Ukraine can be found at the FFU official website and supplemented by the National Football Teams website.

References

External links
 Demetradze moves to Israel, sport.ru, 4 February 2006
 Profile at Dynamo Kyiv's fansite
 Profile  at GeorgianSoccer.com
 Demetradze in Spain

 
 

Living people
1976 births
Association football forwards
Footballers from Georgia (country)
Georgia (country) international footballers
FC Dinamo Tbilisi players
Feyenoord players
FC Spartak Vladikavkaz players
FC Dynamo Kyiv players
FC Dynamo-2 Kyiv players
Real Sociedad footballers
FC Lokomotiv Moscow players
FC Metalurh Donetsk players
Maccabi Tel Aviv F.C. players
FC Arsenal Kyiv players
FC Baku players
FC Spartaki Tskhinvali players
Erovnuli Liga players
Russian Premier League players
Eredivisie players
La Liga players
Ukrainian Premier League players
Ukrainian First League players
Expatriate footballers from Georgia (country)
Expatriate footballers in the Netherlands
Expatriate sportspeople from Georgia (country) in the Netherlands
Expatriate footballers in Russia
Expatriate sportspeople from Georgia (country) in Russia
Expatriate footballers in Ukraine
Expatriate footballers in Spain
Expatriate sportspeople from Georgia (country) in Spain
Expatriate footballers in Azerbaijan
Expatriate sportspeople from Georgia (country) in Azerbaijan
Ukrainian Premier League top scorers
Expatriate sportspeople from Georgia (country) in Ukraine